Acanthophila latipennella is a moth in the family Gelechiidae. It is found in south-eastern Siberia and Europe, where it has been recorded from Norway south to Italy and east to Russia.

The larvae feed on Picea abies.

References

latipennella
Moths described in 1937
Moths of Europe
Moths of Asia